James Strauss may refer to:

 James D. Strauss (born 1929), American theologian
 James Strauss (footballer) (born 1990), Australian rules footballer
 James Strauss (flautist) (born 1974), Brazilian flautist and musicologist
 James H. Strauss Jr., American biologist